Kensal Green & Harlesden was a railway station on the North London Line. It was opened by Hampstead Junction Railway in 1861, and closed in 1873. On closure, it was replaced by Kensal Rise railway station.

References
Kensal Green and Harlesden, Brent Heritage

Disused railway stations in the London Borough of Brent
Railway stations in Great Britain opened in 1861
Railway stations in Great Britain closed in 1873
1861 establishments in England
Kensal Green